John Abarough or Barow (by 1483 – 1540 or later), of Salisbury, Wiltshire, was an English politician.

Career
Abarough was Mayor of Salisbury in 1505 and elected a Member of Parliament for Salisbury 1515 and 1523.

References

Year of birth unknown
1540 deaths
15th-century births
16th-century deaths
People from Salisbury
Mayors of Salisbury
English MPs 1515
English MPs 1523